The Sony Xperia 1 IV is an Android smartphone manufactured by Sony. Launched on May 11, 2022, it succeeds the Xperia 1 III as the latest flagship of Sony's Xperia series. The device was announced along with the mid-range Xperia 10 IV, with expected release dates by June 2022 (Asian markets) and as late as September 2022 for other markets including the US. US shipments were delayed and ultimately began in late October 2022.

Design
The Xperia 1 IV is designed with more professionalism in mind, while improving on the now-signature designs of its predecessors, the Xperia 1 II and Xperia 1 III. It features a grippier matte frame and rear frosted glass finish akin to the Xperia PRO-I, and a boxier design than the previous flagships. The phone has Corning Gorilla Glass Victus protection both on the front and the back as well as IP65 and IP68 certifications for water resistance.

The display still has symmetrical bezels on the top and the bottom, a hallmark Xperia design, where the front-facing dual stereo speakers and the front camera are placed. The left side of the phone is completely devoid of any controls or ports, with only antenna bands present. The microSD/SIM card combo tray now found at the bottom (or right-side if placed in landscape) along with the USB-C 3.2 port and the primary microphone, while the right side contains the fingerprint reader embedded into the power button, a volume rocker, and a dedicated 2-stage shutter button with an embossed finish, the previously included customisable shortcut button from the Mark 3 omitted.

The rear cameras are arranged in a vertical strip like its predecessor, with the LED flash and color spectrum sensor along the top. The phone will be available in three colors: Black, White, and Purple, with only Black and Purple being available in the North American market.

Specifications

Hardware
The Xperia 1 IV is powered by the 4 nm (4LPE) Qualcomm Snapdragon 8 Gen 1 SoC and an Adreno 730 GPU, accompanied by 12GB of LPDDR5 RAM, 256 GB or 512 GB storage space (expandable up to 1 TB), and single/dual-hybrid nano-SIM card slot depending on region. The phone features a 21:9 4K CinemaWide HDR 10-bit 120 Hz OLED display first seen in the Xperia 1 III, now improved with 50% more brightness. The phone has a larger 5000 mAh battery (from 4500 mAh of the 1 III), and supports 30 W Fast Charging alongside Qi wireless charging with reverse wireless charging support. The phone has front-facing dual stereo speakers with redesigned drivers, and support for 360 Reality Audio. There is also a 3.5 mm stereo audio jack with support for both high-resolution audio output as well as microphone input for plugged in peripherals such as an external microphone for vlogging.

Camera 
The Xperia 1 IV has an improved triple camera setup from the 1 III. All three cameras are still 12 Megapixels, but sporting new sensors and optics for the ultrawide and telephoto. They consist of the main 12 MP Exmor RS IMX557 sensor behind a 24 mm f/1.7 lens with OIS, an ultrawide 12MP IMX563 sensor with 16 mm f/2.2 lens, both of which have phase-detection autofocus, and a 0.3 MP IMX316 3D TOF depth sensor.

The highlight of the 1 IV is its continuous zoom telephoto lens, a major improvement over its predecessor's variable zoom telephoto. It is a 12 MP 1/3.5" sensor with 1.0µm pixels and PDAF, contained in the same periscope design like the 1 III, it can now zoom between 85mm all the way up to 125mm without any stepping or using digital zoom, just like a true digital camera. There is no confirm detail on the specific Sony IMX sensor used on the telephoto, other than some insights by independent reviewers such as GSMArena where they've discovered that it is "presumably" an IMX650, a 40-MP sensor with a 1/1.7-inch optical format that was last used on the Huawei P30 and P30 Pro smartphones. Whether or not this is true, either implementing the same 12-MP crop as the Xperia PRO-I on the IMX650, or the hardware information app HWiNFO used could be reporting incorrect data (which according to Notebookcheck seems unlikely), or if it's using a new or unknown IMX sensor altogether, remains to be seen.

All 3 cameras of the 1 IV use ZEISS T✻ (T-Star) anti-reflective coating on each lens and has support for 4K video recording up to 120 FPS and 2K for up to 120 FPS like its predecessors, and it improves on the 20 FPS burst feature where it is now available on all 3 cameras. Digital zoom on the main camera can reach the equivalent of 300mm with the "AI super resolution zoom" first featured on the 1 III. It also has improved Realtime Tracking with enhanced Eye AF for human, animals and birds, instantly locking focus on the subject's eyes without losing track upon sudden loss of focus from the frame.

For the first time, a new 12 MP front-facing camera with support for 4K video recording is present in the 1 IV. Surprisingly, it is the Sony IMX663 (in place of the previous Samsung ISOCELL sensor), the same sensor that was first used as the telephoto sensor for the Xperia 1 III and the Xperia PRO-I, making it on-par with the likes of Google's Pixel 6 Pro smartphone and marking another improvement over its predecessors' outdated 8 MP-resolution front cameras.

Software
The Xperia 1 IV runs on the latest Android 12, with promise for 2 major Android software revisions and 2 years of software support. It is also equipped with 3 different camera apps specifically made to take advantage of the 1 IV's camera hardware: "Photo Pro", developed by Sony's α (Alpha) camera division, focuses on the full manual control setup and configuration commonly seen on Sony Alpha line of professional cameras; the professional movie-oriented "Cinema Pro", developed by Sony's cinematography division CineAlta, and the "Basic Mode" first seen on the 1 III, replacing the stock camera app but with additional controls from the "Photo Pro".

Notes

References

Android (operating system) devices
Flagship smartphones
Sony smartphones
Mobile phones introduced in 2022
Mobile phones with multiple rear cameras
Mobile phones with 4K video recording